Nammukku Paarkkuvan Munthirithoppukal is an Indian Malayalam Television Series which aired on Surya TV and Streamed on Sun NXT from 22 June 2020 to 2 October 2020.

Plot 
Solomon and Sophie fall in love with each other after a series of unfortunate events. Just when they dream of a life together, their love life faces many setbacks. These star-crossed lovers kept their love for each other against all odds. They overcome everything and fall in love again.

Cast 

Jayakrishnan Kichu as Solamon
 Raksha Raj as Sofia
 Shobha Mohan as Reethamma
 Shobhi Thilakan
 Dinesh Panicker as Police Officer
 Sindhu Varma
 Kishore
 P. Sreekumar

Title Song

References 

2020 Indian television series debuts
Surya TV original programming
Malayalam-language television shows